The John Drainie Award was an award given to an individual who has made a significant contribution to broadcasting in Canada. Although meant to be presented annually there have been years where it was not presented.

Originally created by ACTRA in 1968 as a standalone award, the award was named in memory of Canadian actor John Drainie following his death in 1966, and was presented as part of the Canadian Film Awards ceremonies for its first four years. Beginning in 1972 it was presented as part of the expanded ACTRA Awards program. 

The award was transferred in 1986 to the Academy of Canadian Cinema and Television and presented as part of the Gemini Awards; the award was later transferred back to the ACTRA Awards in the 2000s, and presented as part of the Banff Television Festival.

Unlike other awards which are voted on by the Academy's board of directors, the recipient of the John Drainie Award was selected by a committee of previous winners. Any branch of the Academy's Television Division may put forth nominations to the Drainie Committee for consideration.  The recipient receives a plaque with Drainie's likeness rather than a Gemini statuette. It was presented posthumously on some occasions but current ACTRA policy is to present this award to living people.

Winners 
The following people have won the award since 1968.

Canadian Film Awards
1968: Esse Ljungh, W.O. Mitchell, Jean Murray, Tommy Tweed
1969: Andrew Allan
1970: Harry J. Boyle
1971: Lister Sinclair

ACTRA Awards
1972: Graham Spry
1973: Rupert Caplan
1974: Len Peterson
1975: Robert Weaver
1976: Jane Mallett
1977: John Reeves
1978: Wayne and Shuster
1979: Ruth Springford
1980: Norman Campbell
1981: Frances Hyland
1982: Mavor Moore
1983: Lucio Agostini
1984: Robert Christie
1985: Fred Diehl
1986: Bernard Cowan

Gemini Awards
1986: Pat Patterson
1987: Ross McLean
1988: Davidson Dunton
1989: Peter Gzowski 
1990: Allan McFee
1991: not presented
1992: Gordon Pinsent
1993: Barbara Frum
1994: Max Ferguson
1995: Knowlton Nash
1996: Dodi Robb
1997: Joe Schlesinger
1998 (Mar): Peter Herrndorf
1998 (Oct): Bernie Lucht
1999: Pierre Berton
2000: Shelagh Rogers

Banff World Media Festival
2001: not presented
2002: David Suzuki
2003: Jim Murray
2004: Daryl Duke
2005: Vicki Gabereau
2006: Wendy Mesley
2008: Carol Off
2011: Barbara Budd
2014: Mack Furlong

See also
 Canadian television awards

References

Gemini Awards
ACTRA Awards